Vasilisa Alexandrovna Davankova (born 2 May 1998) is a Russian YouTuber and a former ice dancer and pair skater. With former partner Andrei Deputat, she was the 2012 World Junior bronze medalist, the 2012–13 JGP Final silver medalist, and the 2012 Russian Junior champion. She then briefly teamed up with Alexander Enbert but ended their partnership in 2015.

Personal life 
Vasilisa Davankova was born on 2 May 1998 in Moscow. She has a younger brother, Nikita, born in 2001. She is a quarter Greek. In May 2016, Davankova married her coach Nikolai Morozov, right after she turned 18. In July 2019 during an interview, Davankova revealed that she and Morozov were divorced.

Career

Early years 
Davankova began skating at age seven, following her younger brother Nikita. As a singles skater, she was coached by Elena Alexandrova. Her next coaches were Alexei Ryabov and Ekaterina Ryabova. After switching to pairs, Davankova joined Sergei Dobroskokov's group and skated with Semion Kazantsev during the 2010–11 season.

Partnership with Deputat 
Davankova and Ukrainian pair skater Andrei Deputat skated in the same group before teaming up in May 2011. In December 2011, they competed on the senior level at the 2012 Russian Championships. They were seventh in the short program but finished fifth overall, receiving the highest TES in the free skate ahead of the gold medalists Vera Bazarova / Yuri Larionov. In February 2012, they won the gold medal at the 2012 Russian Junior Championships after placing first in both the short and free segments. Deputat was released by Ukraine to represent Russia. Davankova/Deputat won the bronze medal in their international debut at the 2012 World Junior Championships.

In the 2012–13 season, Davankova/Deputat won silver at their first JGP event in Lake Placid, New York. At their second event, in Zagreb, Croatia, they took the bronze and qualified for the JGP Final in Sochi, Russia, where they won the silver medal behind Lina Fedorova / Maxim Miroshkin. By that time, Davankova had grown to 1.55 m. Davankova/Deputat finished seventh in their second appearance at the 2013 Russian Championships. In January 2013, Davankova injured her leg at a training session, resulting in the pair withdrawing from the 2013 Russian Junior Championships. She was on crutches for two weeks. In late March, Deputat injured his right leg and decided to undergo a meniscus operation.

In 2013–14, Davankova/Deputat began their season by winning bronze at the 2013 JGP Belarus. A silver medal at the 2013 JGP Estonia qualified them to the JGP Final in Fukuoka, Japan. At the final, Davankova/Deputat placed fifth in both segments and overall. At the Russian Championships, the pair finished fifth on the senior level and then won the bronze medal on the junior level. Davankova/Deputat were assigned to the 2014 World Junior Championships in Sofia, Bulgaria, where they finished fourth after placing third in the short program and fifth in the free skate. Their partnership ended because Deputat was struggling with elements as Davankova grew taller.

Partnership with Enbert 
Davankova considered a junior-level partnership with Maxim Bobrov, skating with him for three weeks, before receiving a proposal from more experienced pair skater Alexander Enbert and coach Nina Mozer. On 30 April 2014, Mozer announced that Davankova/Enbert had teamed up and would be coached by her in Moscow. Davankova said they would begin training on 12 May. The pair performed an exhibition a few weeks later at a charity gala in Luzhniki. In 2015, it was announced that Davankova had broken up with Enbert and he will skate with a new partner, Natalia Zabiiako.

Partnership with Shibnev 
In summer 2016 it became known that Davankova had decided to switch divisions from pair skating to ice dance, and would start skating with Anton Shibnev as her partner. In 2017 Shibnev started skating with a new partner.

After skating: career on YouTube 
After finishing her skating career, Davankova switched to YouTube. She is now one of the most popular Russian bloggers with over 1 million subscribers on YouTube and almost 300.000 followers on Instagram. She calls herself 'the most fearless blogger of Russian YouTube'.

Programs

With Shibnev

With Enbert

With Deputat

Competitive highlights 
GP: Grand Prix; CS: Challenger Series; JGP: Junior Grand Prix

Ice dance career with Shibnev

Pair skating career with Enbert

Pair skating career with Deputat

Detailed results

With Deputat

References

External links 

 

Russian female pair skaters
1998 births
Living people
Figure skaters from Moscow
World Junior Figure Skating Championships medalists
Russian people of Greek descent
Russian YouTubers
Competitors at the 2017 Winter Universiade